Jacobus ("Koos") Moerenhout (born 5 November 1973 in Achthuizen) is a Dutch former professional road bicycle racer.

Major results

1994
 1st, Overall, Tour de Liège
1996
 1st, Overall, Circuit Franco-Belge
 Winner Stage 1
 Winner Points Competition
 1st, Dokkum Woudenomloop
1997
 1st, Stage 8, Rheinland-Pfalz Rundfahrt
 Winner Mountain Competition
1998
 1st, Profronde van Oostvoorne
1999
 1st, Stage 4, Tour of the Basque Country
 Winner Mountain Competition
2000
 1st, Stage 1, Tour Down Under
 1st, Steenwijk
 2nd, National Road Race Championship
2003
 1st, Stage 4, Rheinland-Pfalz Rundfahrt
2004
 1st, Izegem
 2nd, National Road Race Championship
2005
 12th, Vuelta a España
2006
 1st, Zevenbergen & Geleen
2007
  Dutch National Road Race Championship
 1st, Acht van Chaam
2009
  Dutch National Road Race Championship
 1st, Stage 7, Tour of Austria
2010
 1st, Stage 3, Eneco Tour

General classification results timeline

See also
 List of Dutch Olympic cyclists

References

External links 
Personal website
 

1973 births
Living people
Dutch male cyclists
Cyclists at the 2000 Summer Olympics
Olympic cyclists of the Netherlands
People from Oostflakkee
UCI Road World Championships cyclists for the Netherlands
Cyclists from South Holland